Jonathan A. "Yoni" Pizer is a former Democratic member of the Illinois House from the 12th district from his appointment on February 9, 2020 to December 31, 2020. The 12th district includes parts of the Chicago neighborhoods of Lake View, Lincoln Park, Near North Side, and Uptown.

Early life
Pizer earned a bachelor's degree in economics from the University of Wisconsin–Madison and an MBA from the Kellogg School of Management at Northwestern University.

Political career
He served as a community liaison for Illinois congressman Mike Quigley.

Pizer was appointed to the Illinois House to fill the seat vacated by Sara Feigenholtz, who left the seat to join the Illinois Senate. His appointment was controversial, as his appointment came just 38 days before the general primary. He ran to the keep the seat in the Democratic Party primary, garnering an endorsement from Chicago mayor Lori Lightfoot. He was defeated in the primary by fellow Democratic challenger Margaret Croke.

On December 30, 2020, Pizer announced his resignation to be effective the next day, saying that he was "leaving office because of the State’s policy to effectively terminate health insurance for me and my family on 12/31/20, even though my term ends on January 13, 2021", returning to his prior position as community liaison in Congressman Quigley's office.

Electoral history

References

Living people
Kellogg School of Management alumni
University of Wisconsin–Madison College of Letters and Science alumni
Democratic Party members of the Illinois House of Representatives
21st-century American politicians
Year of birth missing (living people)